The Knickerbocker Athletic Club was an early amateur and later professional football team based in Manhattan, New York City from around 1897 until 1902. The team is best known for participating in the 1902 World Series of Football. During the event, the Knickerbockers defeated the Warslow Athletic Club from Long Island by a score of 11-6. However, the Knickerbockers were defeated by the Syracuse Athletic Club, 36-0, on New Year's Eve. During the 1903 World Series of Football, the Olympic Athletic Club defeated Knickerbockers 6-0, on December 14, 1903.

Other games
On Thanksgiving Day 1897, the Knickerbockers traveled to Chicago, Illinois to play the Bankers Athletic Club. The Knickerbockers lost that game 46-8. On October 15, 1898, the team was reportedly defeated by the Duquesne Country and Athletic Club from Pittsburgh, Pennsylvania, by a score of 45-0. Other records show that the team battled the Orange Athletic Club to scoreless games in 1898 and 1899, while the team defeated the Orange 12-0 on November 19, 1898. However, the records show Orange defeating the Knickerbockers 11-10 on November 7, 1899. On October 18, 1903, the Knickerbockers defeated a team of United States Marines from the Brooklyn Navy Yard, 47-0.

External links 

Orange Athletic Club of New Jersey: Complete Football Records

1897 establishments in New York City
1902 disestablishments in New York (state)
World Series of Football (1902–03)
American football teams in New York City
Defunct American football teams in New York (state)
American football teams established in 1897
American football teams disestablished in 1903
 Athletic Club football teams and seasons